Baumé is a French restaurant in Palo Alto, California, opened in 2010 by chef Bruno Chemel. Until 2021, it had two Michelin stars. Originally seating 35, the restaurant was reduced to two tables in the mid-2010s, and is now staffed only by Chemel and his wife.

History
Chemel, a Frenchman who had worked as a chef at Michelin-starred restaurants in France, was head chef at Chez TJ in Mountain View beginning in early 2008; after it lost one of its two Michelin stars in 2009, he left at the end of the year and in 2010 opened Baumé in nearby Palo Alto. The restaurant initially seated 22, later 35; in the mid-2010s, Chemel reduced seating, laid off all staff, and  he and his wife, Christie, run the restaurant alone, with a single evening service of two tables five nights a week and a required wine pairing. Their son has assisted in the kitchen.

Baumé was awarded a Michelin star in its first year and a second star in 2011 and every following year until 2021, when it did not receive a star. In an interview in 2017, Chemel said that he aspired to earn a third star, but in 2021 he said he had asked Michelin to remove Baumé from its guide because as an essentially private restaurant, it no longer fit the company's "guidelines".

In February 2022, Chemel announced that he Baumé would close and reopen on March 8, 2022 as Bistronomie by Baumé. He explained his decision to rebrand as an opportunity for a fresh start with a less expensive menu: "In the spirit of bistronomy, I see an opportunity to serve high-level meals at lower prices in a more relaxed environment."

Menu
The restaurant specializes in French gastronomy; in a local listing, Chemel has described it as "French Cuisine Moderne with a Zen Touch"; his training included studying macrobiotic cooking in Japan. At its inception, it was known for molecular gastronomy; it was named after the chemist Antoine Baumé, inventor of the Baumé scale for measuring the density of liquids. By 2015, this emphasis had lessened.  Baumé has a pescatarian and a Wagyu beef tasting menu, and a mandated wine pairing. In summer 2020, during the COVID-19 pandemic, the restaurant began offering a four-course take-out menu.

See also

 List of French restaurants
 List of Michelin starred restaurants in San Francisco Bay Area

References

External links
Official website
Baumé restaurant, archived from the original on February 16, 2013

Restaurants established in 2010
Molecular gastronomy
Michelin Guide starred restaurants in California
French-American culture in California
French restaurants in California
Restaurants in the San Francisco Bay Area
Companies based in Palo Alto, California
2010 establishments in California